Mr. Pig is a 2016 Mexican drama film directed by Diego Luna and written by Diego Luna and Augusto Mendoza. The film stars Danny Glover, Maya Rudolph, José María Yazpik and Joel Murray.

Cast
Danny Glover as Ambrose
Maya Rudolph as Eunice
José María Yazpik as Payo
Joel Murray as Gringo
Angélica Aragón as Chila
Gabriela Araujo as Brianda
Paulino Partida as Ermilo
Johanna Murillo as Payo's Wife
Juan Pablo Medina as Customs Agent
Pablo Cruz as Tourist
Carisa de Leon as Payo's Wife's Friend
Gerardo Elizalde as Police
Alejandro Luna as Doctor
Raymundo Medina as Dead Cattle Buyer
Hector Molina as Rancher

Release
The film premiered at the 2016 Sundance Film Festival on January 26, 2016.

References

External links
 
 

2016 films
English-language Mexican films
2016 drama films
Mexican drama films
2010s English-language films
2010s Mexican films